CDK5 regulatory subunit-associated protein 2 is a protein that in humans is encoded by the CDK5RAP2 gene. It has necessary roles in the formation and stability of microtubules from the centrosome and has been found to be linked to human brain size variation in males. Multiple transcript variants exist for this gene, but the full-length nature of only two has been determined.

CDK5RAP2 is homologous to the Drosophila protein centrosomin (cnn) and paralogous to myomegalin, which in mammals contains an Olduvai domain, a domain implicated in human brain size evolution.

Function 

CDK5RAP2 is necessary for the proper formation, anchoring and orientation of microtubules from the centrosome. It binds with the γ-tubulin ring complex (γTuRC), and this is required for the γTuRC to attach to the centrosome. CDK5RAP2 also binds to p25, a form of CDK5R1 that serves as the activating subunit of CDK5, which is involved in the regulation of neuronal differentiation. CDK5RAP2 therefore has a role in neuronal differentiation. CDK5RAP2 is also necessary as a scaffolding protein in the centrosomal corona of Dictyostelium.

Clinical significance

Human brain size variation 
An MRI study has demonstrated a link between common human variation in the CDK5RAP2 gene and brain structure. More specifically, associations were found between several single nucleotide polymorphisms (SNPs) and brain cortical surface area and total brain volume. These associations were found exclusively in male subjects, and all SNPs were located either in the last 7 introns or downstream of the gene. The functional significance of these loci is not yet known. However, given their location close to regulatory elements, it is possible that they are involved in gene regulation, which suggests that common variance in brain structure could be associated with differences in gene regulation rather than protein structure, consistent with findings in other complex human traits. CDK5RAP2 is a paralogue of myomegalin, which in mammals contains an Olduvai domain, a domain with human-specific duplications that have been implicated in human brain size evolution.

Autosomal recessive primary microcephaly 
Mutations in CDK5RAP2 cause autosomal recessive primary microcephaly type 3.

Interactions 

CDK5RAP2 has been shown to interact with CDK5R1 and pericentrin (PCTN).

History 
The gene was discovered in 2000 and was first characterised in 2007.

References

Further reading

External links 
 

Centrosome